The 1932 Atlantic hurricane season featured several powerful storms, including the Cuba hurricane, which remains the deadliest tropical cyclone in the history of Cuba and among the most intense to strike the island nation. It was a relatively active season, with fifteen known storms, six hurricanes, and four major hurricanes. However, tropical cyclones that did not approach populated areas or shipping lanes, especially if they were relatively weak and of short duration, may have remained undetected. Because technologies such as satellite monitoring were not available until the 1960s, historical data on tropical cyclones from this period are often not reliable. The Atlantic hurricane reanalysis project discovered four new tropical cyclones, all of which were tropical storms, that occurred during the year. Two storms attained Category 5 intensity, the first known occurrence in which multiple Category 5 hurricanes formed in the same year. The season's first cyclone developed on May 5, while the last remaining system transitioned into an extratropical cyclone by November 13.

The strongest storm of the season was the Cuba hurricane, which heavily impacted portions of northern Colombia, the Netherlands Antilles, the Greater Antilles, and the Bahamas in November, leaving at least 3,144 fatalities and $44 million (1932 USD) in damage,  the vast majority of which occurred in Cuba. In early September, the Bahamas hurricane devastated portions of the island nation as a Category 5 hurricane, resulting in at least 16 deaths. Another destructive storm was the Freeport hurricane, which caused 40 deaths and about $7.5 million in damage in Texas in August. The San Ciprian hurricane also wreaked havoc on the Virgin Islands, Puerto Rico, and the Dominican Republic in late September, with damage totaling approximately $35.8 million and the death toll reaching 272. Collectively, the tropical cyclones during the 1932 season caused around $87.57 million in damage and at least 3,473 fatalities.

Season summary

Tropical cyclogenesis began in early May, with a system developing over the central Caribbean Sea on May 5. The storm made landfall in the Dominican Republic, before becoming extratropical offshore the East Coast of the United States on May 10. However, the season went dormant for about three months until the next system, the Freeport hurricane, formed over the southern Gulf of Mexico on August 12. Two other storms originated in the month of August – the Florida–Alabama and Bahamas hurricanes. September was the most active month, with a total of six tropical cyclones developing, five tropical storms and one hurricane, the San Ciprián hurricane. Four more tropical cyclone formed in October, including three tropical storms and a hurricane, the Cuba hurricane, though much of its duration was in November. The season's final tropical cyclone, a hurricane, developed well east of the Windward Islands on November 3 and transitioned into an extratropical cyclone southwest of the Azores on November 10.

A total of fifteen tropical cyclones developed, the most since 1916. Six of the systems strengthened into a hurricane, while four reached major hurricane status, which is Category 3 or higher on the Saffir–Simpson scale. Two cyclones intensified into Category 5 hurricanes, making the season the first of only seven featuring multiple Category 5 storms, the other years being 1933, 1961, 2005, 2007, 2017, and 2019. The Bahamas hurricane became the first of four tropical cyclones to have struck the Bahamas at Category 5 intensity, later followed by the Cuba–Brownsville hurricane in 1933, Hurricane Andrew in 1992, and Hurricane Dorian in 2019. Additionally, the Cuba hurricane remains among the most intense tropical systems to strike that country. Most of the storms also impacted land, with several causing devastating effects. Overall, the tropical cyclones of the season collectively resulted in at least $87.57 million in damage and approximately 3,473 deaths.

The season's total activity was reflected with an accumulated cyclone energy (ACE) rating of 170, the highest value since 1926, and well above the 1931–1943 average of 91.2. ACE is a metric used to express the energy used by a tropical cyclone during its lifetime. Therefore, a storm with a longer duration will have high values of ACE. Thus, tropical depressions are not included here.

Systems

Tropical Storm One 

A tropical depression formed on May 5 in the south-central Caribbean Sea. Within six hours, the storm emerged into the western Atlantic on May 8 and continued to strengthen. The diffuse system later transitioned into an extratropical cyclone the same day, later dissipating on May 11 well to the northwest of Bermuda after merging with a frontal boundary.

Hurricane Two 

The Freeport Hurricane of 1932 

A tropical disturbance developed into a tropical storm in the southern Gulf of Mexico near the Yucatán Peninsula early on August 12. Moving north-northwestward, the cyclone strengthened into a hurricane by early the next day. Thereafter, the storm rapidly intensified, becoming a Category 4 hurricane early on August 13. The cyclone then rapidly weakened, falling below major hurricane intensity just eight hours later and to tropical storm intensity about fourteen hours after landfall. On August 15, the system deteriorated to a tropical depression, before dissipating over the Texas Panhandle around 18:00 UTC.

Official warning on the storm began just four hours prior to the storm's landfall in Texas, forcing many people evacuating inland to abandon their cars in high winds and heavy rains. In Galveston, power to electrical and phone service was cut off, temporarily reducing communications. The passage between Galveston Island and mainland Texas was flooded, briefly isolating Galveston. Heavy rains occurred, and a foot of rain fell as the storm moved north towards the coast. A total of 40 people were killed by the hurricane. The greatest single death toll for any town was seven in West Columbia, where sustained winds over  flattened several homes. Two neighborhoods that had been constructed for oil industry workers there were nearly destroyed by the high tides and storm surge. Angleton, Freeport, and Galveston suffered extensive wind damage, while the inland towns of Brazoria, West Columbia, Damon and Needville, all in the path of the eye, were also devastated. Damages associated with the hurricane were estimated to total to $7.5 million.

Hurricane Three 

A tropical disturbance was first identified southeast of Puerto Rico on August 24. Moving northwestward, the disturbance developed into a tropical depression two days later north of Hispaniola. Slowly moving towards the west-northwest, it intensified into a tropical storm late on August 27. The storm made landfall on the north end of Key Largo, Florida, with sustained winds of  around 04:00 UTC on August 30, before striking the mainland south of Homestead. Over land, the hurricane weakened, and after becoming an extratropical cyclone over northwestern Mississippi on September 2, the storm merged with another extratropical system over Quebec on September 4.

At the storm's landfall in southern Florida, heavy rains and strong winds caused extensive damage to crops, particularly to avocado and citrus. A fire in Hollywood that firefighters were unable to extinguish due to winds damaging equipment led to approximately $20,000 in damage. As the strengthening hurricane moved northwestwards through the Gulf of Mexico, it generated strong surf that caused severe damage to coastal areas across western Florida, before making its second landfall, where it produced hurricane-force winds across a wide swath of the coast. In and around Pensacola, the hurricane caused about $100,000 in damage, including impacts to buildings, homes, waterfront properties, power lines, and cotton crops. Agricultural lands in coastal regions of Mississippi and Alabama were damaged by strong winds and heavy rain. Storm surge also submerged portions of Bayou La Batre and Mobile in Alabama, with about $105,000 in damage in the latter. The hurricane caused one death and about $229,000 in total damages across its path.

Hurricane Four 

 The Great Bahamas Hurricane of 1932 

A tropical depression was first detected north of the Virgin Islands late on August 30. Moving towards the west-northwest, the depression steadily intensified, reaching tropical storm strength and later hurricane strength on September 2, as it passed near the Turks and Caicos Islands. After reaching hurricane intensity, the hurricane began to rapidly intensify, becoming a major hurricane on September 4. Shortly thereafter, the hurricane struck the Abaco Islands. Curving north-northeastward, the cyclone slowly weakened, falling to Category 4 intensity by late on September 6. The extratropical cyclone brushed Newfoundland and traversed across Iceland and later dissipated just offshore Russia's Kola Peninsula on September 17.

The hurricane caused extensive devastation across much of the Bahamas, where it killed 16 people and injured an additional 300 people. Strong winds destroyed numerous homes and hampered water and food supplies. The large hurricane also generated a strong storm surge which inundated the Abaco Islands. The Abaco Islands were the worst impacted area, where the severity of damage indicated that sustained wind speeds exceeded . At Hope Town, the hurricane demolished 83 homes, severely damaged 63 others, and damaged 40 others to a lesser degree. Strong winds also destroyed all churches and public buildings in the community. Similarly, all buildings – including churches, government buildings, and schools – and homes were demolished on Green Turtle Cay. Only six homes remained standing in Coopers Town and just four others withstood the hurricane at Great Guana Cay. The hurricane also completely destroyed the Bluff Point community. Most homes in Marsh Harbour were severely damaged, while the cyclone destroyed 12 other homes and all schools in the town. Effects in the United States were much less severe, due to the distance of the hurricane. However, strong gales still swept through much of New England. In Atlantic Canada, the storm caused 14 or 15 deaths, all related to maritime incidents. On land, wind gusts reached  in Halifax, Nova Scotia. Some homes and buildings were damaged or destroyed, while approximately 10 percent of apple crops in Annapolis Valley were lost.

Tropical Storm Five 

At the time, a warm front and cold front were connected to the system, but further observations revealed minimal temperature deviations. The following day, the disturbance appeared to have acquired subtropical characteristics, but became tropical after observations showed that winds associated with the storm were near the center.

Tropical Storm Six 

A tropical storm formed in the Bay of Campeche on September 9. Moving slowly northwards, the storm reached its peak intensity with maximum sustained winds of  while located south of the Mississippi River Delta. Beginning on September 14, the storm began to accelerate as it turned towards the northeast. Around 04:00 UTC on September 15, the cyclone made landfall in St. Marks, Florida, at peak intensity. The storm crossed the state quickly and briefly entered Georgia before emerging into the Atlantic less than eight hours after landfall. However, the system soon transitioned into an extratropical cyclone a short distance east of Sapelo Island around 12:00 UTC on September 15. The extratropical cyclone quickly accelerated parallel to the United States East Coast, before being absorbed by another extratropical system over Quebec.

The storm's quick passage over the Florida peninsula left relatively minor damage. A train crossed over a washout on its railroad, causing it to derail. In Apalachicola, there was considerable damage to crops, and torrential rains caused $2,000 in damages. Electric power in the city was also disabled, and some buildings suffered structural damage, totaling to $8,000 in damages. Tallahassee observed  of precipitation. In Georgia, Thomasville and Valdosta experienced "high winds and considerable rainfall," according to the Tallahassee Democrat. A few weather stations along the East Coast of the United States recorded sustained tropical storm force winds, including Hatteras, North Carolina; Atlantic City, New Jersey; and New York City, New York. There were scattered reports of wind damage across Atlantic Canada, including the toppling of telephone and electrical wires, and the deroofing of buildings and homes. In Nova Scotia, Annapolis Valley lost approximately 75% of its apple crops. The storm also left maritime impacts, damaging or destroying docks, wharves, and boats. At least one death occurred in Canada, while eight other people went missing along with their vessel.

Tropical Storm Seven 

Moving slowly towards the northwest, gales were reported by ships in the region as the cyclone slowly intensified. On September 20, the storm began to move towards the southwest. The extratropical cyclone later made landfall on Nova Scotia the following day, before dissipating over southern Greenland on September 26.

Tropical Storm Eight 

Another tropical depression was first identified on September 18 in the Bay of Campeche. The storm subsequently made landfall near Morgan City, Louisiana, at 19:00 UTC on September 19. Weakening over land, the tropical storm degenerated to a tropical depression at 12:00 UTC on September 20, before becoming extratropical the next day just west of Louisville, Kentucky, and later dissipating after it was absorbed by an approaching frontal system over southern Ohio late on September 21.

Since the storm made landfall in a sparsely populated region of Louisiana, only minimal damage was reported. Prior to the storm's landfall, however, hedge selling of cotton were offset in late dealings caused by fears of the storm's potential impact. Tropical storm-force winds damaged some fishing shacks in southwestern Louisiana. Another tornado in Gulfport, Mississippi, damaged half a dozen homes and injured three people.

Hurricane Nine 

San Ciprián hurricane of 1932 

On September 25, ships first noted a tropical storm east of the Leeward Islands. The storm quickly intensified as it moved towards the west due to a nearby high pressure system, reaching hurricane strength at 12:00 UTC that day. The hurricane slightly weakened over the island, and after crossing the Mona Passage, made a second landfall in southern areas of the Dominican Republic as a Category 2 hurricane. Its passage of Hispaniola significantly weakened the hurricane, downgrading it to tropical strength on September 28. After brushing Jamaica to the south, the storm remained weak as it traversed the Caribbean. The cyclone made landfall in British Honduras between Hopkins and Placencia with winds of  late on October 1. Thereafter, the storm quickly weakened and dissipated over southeastern Mexico on October 3.

On Saint Thomas, winds downed wires and trees and damaged homes. The storm also capsized ships in Saint Thomas harbor and at Tortola. Property damage on Saint Thomas alone exceeded $200,000, while 15 fatalities were reported. Most of the damage caused by the San Ciprián hurricane occurred in Puerto Rico, particularly along the island's northern half, with the cyclone drawing comparisons to the 1928 Okeechobee hurricane. The powerful winds destroyed numerous buildings. More than 40,000 homes were demolished, rendering 25,000 families homeless. Winds also knocked out communications systems, hampering relief efforts. Heavy losses were incurred to crops, particularly to citrus and coffee. The hurricane caused 257 deaths and injured 4,820 other people, while inflicting about $35.6 million in damage. Economic losses related to the hurricane amounted to about 20 percent of Puerto Rico's gross income. Significant damage to agriculture occurred in the Dominican Republic. Impacts in Jamaica and British Honduras were minimal.

Tropical Storm Ten 

Thereafter, the storm interacted with an extratropical cyclone which pulled it to the northwest. The extratropical cyclone later absorbed the system at 06:00 UTC on September 30 near its location of development.

Tropical Storm Eleven 

A tropical depression formed on October 7 from a broad low-pressure area in the central Caribbean offshore Honduras. Moving slowly to the west-northwest, the depression steadily intensified, reaching tropical storm strength at 12:00 UTC the same day. The storm made landfall near Playa del Carmen at 04:00 UTC the next day, while still at peak intensity. Over land, the storm weakened to a tropical depression on October 11 as it curved northwestward. On the next day, the depression later emerged into the Gulf of Mexico, where it began to restrengthen. However, baroclinic forces caused the storm to become extratropical prior to striking Louisiana on October 15. The extratropical remnants of the storm continued to trek to the northeast, before it merged with another extratropical system over West Virginia.

As the system approached the Gulf Coast of the United States, storm warnings were issued from Brownsville, Texas, to Apalachicola, Florida. Its extratropical remnants brought gale–force winds to portions of Louisiana. Offshore, a cargo ship carrying asphalt sunk due to strong waves, causing $30,000 in losses. In addition heavy rains caused rivers to exceed flood stage, particularly east of where the storm made landfall, isolating homes and interrupting traffic. Washout from the rains also caused a train wreck.

Tropical Storm Twelve 

The system was absorbed by a strong cold frontal boundary later that day.

Tropical Storm Thirteen 

On October 17, a stationary front positioned over the eastern Atlantic began to dissipate, and a large area of low pressure began to form along the front boundary. At the same time, the storm also turned eastward, and subsequently began to weaken.

Hurricane Fourteen 

The Great Cuba Hurricane of 1932 

Moving nearly due west, the depression brushed Martinique on October 31, shortly before entering the Caribbean and intensifying into a tropical storm. Upon reaching the central Caribbean, the cyclone turned west-southwestward and strengthened into a hurricane early on November 2. It reached Category 2 status about 24 hours later near the Guajira Peninsula. The storm later turned northward and then northeastward by early November 9, around the time that it weakened to a Category 4 hurricane. Overall, the system maintained Category 5 status for 78 hours, which is the longest amount of time on record for a storm to remain at that intensity. The storm emerged into the Atlantic over the Bahamas and continued to slowly weaken. The extratropical low turned eastward and dissipated near the Azores late on the following day.

In the ABC islands, the hurricane destroyed Curaçao's harbor fortifications, while the pier on Bonaire was demolished. Several coastal towns and seaports in Colombia in the vicinities of Barranquilla and Santa Marta suffered extensive damage. Some inland farms were ruined by flooding and strong winds. On Providencia Island, major damage to agriculture occurred and 36 homes were demolished. High winds in Jamaica downed more than 2 million trees and caused up to a 50 percent loss of banana crops in some areas. Damage in Jamaica totaled approximately $4 million. In the Cayman Islands, the storm was considered the worst to strike the archipelago until Hurricane Ivan in 2004. On Grand Cayman, 60 homes were either destroyed or suffered major damage, rendering about 250 people homeless, while only 6 dwellings remained standing on Little Cayman. The hurricane demolished schools on both Cayman Brac and Grand Cayman. The death toll in the Cayman Islands reached at least 109. Out of the approximately 4,800 residents, an estimated 2,870 people in Santa Cruz del Sur were killed and less than 10 percent of the town's population was uninjured. Few homes in the town remained standing following the storm. Many other communities in the province suffered devastation. A Pan Am radio operator in Nuevitas reported that nearly all frame-buildings in the area were destroyed and most public buildings sustained serious damage. The hurricane also caused impacts in Oriente and Santa Clara provinces. Overall, damage in Cuba totaled approximately $40 million, while at least 3,033 fatalities occurred, making the storm the deadliest in the nation's history. The cyclone also caused significant impacts in the central Bahamas, especially on Cat Island, Exuma, Long Island, and Rum Cay, damaging or destroying many crops, structures, and vessels. Two deaths occurred in the Bahamas. Wind gusts on Bermuda reached  at St. George's, downing some electrical and telephone wires and tree branches.

Hurricane Fifteen 

Throughout its existence, the storm moved in an erratic path, generally to the north. Steadily intensifying, the storm became a hurricane at 1800 UTC on November 6, as it began to move towards the northeast towards the Azores. After reaching peak intensity, a weakening trend began as the storm accelerated east-northeastward. The extratropical system continued to quickly move east-northeastward until it coalesced with another extratropical cyclone on November 11.

Season effects 
The following table lists all of the storms that formed in the 1932 Atlantic hurricane season. It includes their duration, names, areas affected, damages, and death totals. Deaths in parentheses are indirect (an example of an indirect death would be a traffic accident), but were still related to that storm. Damage and deaths include totals from the storm's precursor and its remnants, and all of the damage figures are in 1932 USD.

See also 

 List of tropical cyclones
 List of Atlantic hurricanes
 Atlantic hurricane season

Notes

References

External links 

 Monthly Weather Review

 
Articles which contain graphical timelines